Pazin (also Romanized as Pazīn and Pezīn) is a village in Kuh Mareh Khami Rural District, in the Central District of Basht County, Kohgiluyeh and Boyer-Ahmad Province, Iran. At the 2006 census, its population was 25, in 6 families.

References 

Populated places in Basht County